The Asian-Oceanian Computing Industry Organization (ASOCIO) is a grouping of ICT industry associations representing the Asian-Oceania region. Established in 1984 in Tokyo, Japan, ASOCIO’s objective is to develop the computing society and industry across the Asia Oceania region domain by promoting trade as well as fostering relationships between its member economies. ASOCIO has created links between ICT companies and the industry’s growth in member economies. 

ASOCIO is founded by Japan, Korea Taiwan, Australia and New Zealand in 1984.  It represents the interests of 24 economies from Australia, Bangladesh, Bhutan, Brunei, Cambodia, Hong Kong, India, Indonesia, Japan, Laos, Macau, Malaysia, Mongolia, Myanmar, Nepal, New Zealand, Pakistan, Philippines, Singapore, South Korea, Sri Lanka, Taiwan, Thailand and Vietnam.

ASOCIO Presidency

Chronology of member expansion

External links
 Official website

Information technology organizations based in Asia
International organizations based in Japan